is a 2005 Japanese  television drama series starring Mao Inoue, Jun Matsumoto of Arashi, Shun Oguri, Shota Matsuda, and Tsuyoshi Abe. It is based on the shōjo manga series, written and illustrated by Yoko Kamio. A sequel entitled Hana yori Dango Returns aired in 2007, and a sequel film, Hana yori Dango Final: The Movie, was released in 2008.

Plot synopsis

Tsukushi Makino is a tough, hard-working, lower-middle class student at the prestigious escalator school Eitoku Gakuen. Initially, Makino wanted to attend Eitoku because her idol, an internationally renowned model named Shizuka Todou, was an alumna of the school. Not long after however, Makino discovers the superficial nature of her classmates. Their arrogance and her inability to relate to them because of her social status limit her chances to make friends. Worse yet, the school is ruled by the F4 or Flower Four, composed of playboys Soujiro Nishikado and Akira Mimasaka, introverted but intelligent and handsome Hanazawa Rui and violent and bratty Domyouji Tsukasa. The F4, sons of Japan's wealthiest and most powerful tycoons, bully fellow students out of boredom or malevolence until they are expelled or quit.

Makino's only wish is to remain invisible in Eitoku to avoid getting into trouble. However, she is immersed into the lives of the four legendary bullies after her first and only friend at school, Sakurako Sanjo, accidentally spills juice on Domyouji's white shirt in the cafeteria and she defends her. The next day, she receives a red tag in her locker (an order from the F4 to bully the target student by whatever means possible) and as a result, the whole school turns against her.  Despite the harassment, Tsukushi, the "tough weed", refuses to give in or quit. After Domyouji treads all over the lobster her parents painstakingly cooked for her, she finally snaps, knocks him out and declares war on him. This unexpected retaliation catches him by surprise and causes him to fall in love with her. But Tsukushi has fallen in love with Rui, who in turn harbors romantic feelings for his childhood friend Shizuka.

The courtship between Tsukasa and Tsukushi is the main theme throughout the series. Various challenges threaten their blossoming relationship, including Tsukushi's wavering feelings for Rui, the envy of fellow Eitoku students, an obsessed childhood classmate, their differences in social class, Tsukasa's brash and possessive nature, and the animosity of Kaede Domyouji, Tsukasa's mother. The first season ends with Domyouji giving the saturn necklace to Makino and her confession of love right before he leaves for New York.

Episode overview

Cast

Main Cast
Mao Inoue as Tsukushi Makino 
Jun Matsumoto as Tsukasa Domyouji 
Shun Oguri as Rui Hanazawa 
Shota Matsuda as Soujiro Nishikado 
Tsuyoshi Abe as Akira Mimasaka

Supporting Cast
 Aki Nishihara as Yuki Matsuoka 
 Mayumi Sada as Todo Shizuka 
 Seto Saki as Yuriko Asai 
 Fukada Aki as Erika Ayuhara 
 Matsuoka Emiko as Minako Yamano 
 David Ito as Nishida
 Megumi Sato as Sakurako Sanjo
 Nanako Matsushima as Tsubaki Domyoji
 Mariko Kaga as Kaede Domyoji
 Takako Katou as Sachiyo Sengoku (Okami-San)
 Susumu Kobayashi as Haruo Makino
 Mako Ishino as Chieko Makino
 Satoshi Tomiura as Susumu Makino

Guests
 Kazue Itoh as Minako Yamanaka 
 Masei Nakayama as Junji Terada (Class 2C)
 Kaori Ikeda as Mizuki Morioka 
 Tomohiro Kaku as Shingo Sawatari (Episode 1)
 Kazuma Sano as Takayuki Kimoto (Episode 1)
 Tomoharu Hasegawa (Episode 1)
 Shunji Igarashi (Episode 1)
 Kento Handa as Ryuji (Episode 4-5)
 Tatsuya Gashuin (Episode 4-5)
 Takayuki Takuma (Episode 4-9)
 Shugo Oshinari as Nakatsuka (Episode 6-7)
 Yoko Mitsuya as Nakatsuka's Other Girl (Episode 6-7)
 Ayana Sakai as Ayano Kurimaki (Episode 8-9)
 Kazuaki Hankai as TOJ's Emcee (Episode 8-9)
 Momoko Shibuya as a TOJ Participant (Episode 8-9)
 Sotaro Suzuki (Episode 9)

Production Credits 

 Based on the Boys Over Flowers Comics by: Yoko Kamio
 Screenwriters: Mikio Satake, Yuki Fujimoto, Natsuko Takahashi, Shuuko Arai
 Producer: Katsuaki Setoguchi 
 Directors: Yasuharu Ishii, Daisuke Yamamuro, Osamu Katayama 
 Music: Kosuke Yamashita

Reception

Episode Ratings

Source: Video Research, Ltd.

Recognitions

International broadcast 

In the Philippines, the drama aired on GMA-7.

External links
 Official TV drama website from TBS 
  in the TBS Program Catalog

References

2005 Japanese television series debuts
2005 Japanese television series endings
Boys Over Flowers
Japanese television dramas based on manga
Kin'yō Dorama
Television series about bullying
Television series about teenagers